Sir Leslie Oswald Brown KCB CBE DSC AFC (11 July 1893 – 28 June 1978) was a South African who served with the Royal Air Force (RAF) in both World Wars, attaining the rank of air vice-marshal.

Brown served in East Africa, the Middle East and the United Kingdom. His first years were with the Royal Naval Air Service, before that was absorbed into the newly formed RAF.

He commanded 84 Group as a temporary Air Vice Marshal during the allied advance across north west Europe, assigned to support the First Canadian Army's operations. His staff established extremely close operational contacts with their army opposite numbers, but this was not to the liking of his superior, Air Marshal Sir Arthur Coningham and he was replaced in November, 1944.

He was appointed Commandant of the School of Land/Air Warfare later in 1944 and reverted to his substantive rank of Air Commodore.

Brown was promoted to Air Vice Marshal in October 1946, retired from the RAF on 23 January 1949 and died on 28 June 1978.

References

External links

1893 births
1978 deaths
Commanders of the Order of the British Empire
Knights Commander of the Order of the Bath
Recipients of the Air Force Cross (United Kingdom)
Recipients of the Distinguished Service Cross (United Kingdom)
Recipients of the King Haakon VII Freedom Cross
Royal Air Force air marshals of World War II
Alumni of Hilton College (South Africa)